Compsolechia trapezias is a moth of the family Gelechiidae. It was described by Edward Meyrick in 1922. It is found in Brazil.

The wingspan is about 14 mm. The forewings are brownish ochreous with a faint pinkish tinge, whitish sprinkled in the disc, around the subterminal line more rosy ochreous. There is a black median dot at the base and an oblique blackish fasciate streak from the dorsum at one-fifth, the apex curved over posteriorly and pointed. The costal edge is blackish just before the subterminal line and there is a very oblique white mark on the costa at three-fifths and an interrupted angulated line on the lower three-fifths of the wing to the dorsum before the tornus, cut by a strong black dash in the middle running to near the termen. Immediately beyond this is a rhomboidal black costal blotch extending to near the apex. There are also some white pre-terminal scales on the edges of the black dash, a minute white dot above and another below it. The hindwings are dark fuscous.

References

Moths described in 1922
Compsolechia
Taxa named by Edward Meyrick